The 1962–63 season was the 60th season of competitive football in Belgium. Standard Liège won their 3rd Division I title. RSC Anderlechtois entered the 1962–63 European Champion Clubs' Cup as Belgian title holder and reached the quarter finals, beating Real Madrid in the preliminary round. RU Saint-Gilloise entered the 1962–63 Inter-Cities Fairs Cup. The Belgium national football team started their first UEFA European Football Championship qualification campaign but were eliminated in the preliminary round by Yugoslavia.

Overview
At the end of the season, RU Saint-Gilloise and OC Charleroi were relegated to Division II and were replaced in Division I by RFC Malinois and K Waterschei SV Thor Genk from Division II.
The bottom 2 clubs in Division II (UR Namur and K Olse Merksem SC) were relegated to Division III, to be replaced by KSV Waregem and K Boom FC from Division III.
The bottom club of each Division III league (RAA Louviéroise, RCS Brainois, R Jeunesse Arlonaise and K Tubantia FC) were relegated to Promotion, to be replaced by Voorwaarts Tienen, SK Beveren-Waas, CS Mechelen-aan-de-Maas and Stade Mouscron from Promotion.

National team

* Belgium score given first

Key
 H = Home match
 A = Away match
 N = On neutral ground
 F = Friendly
 ECQ = European Championship qualification
 o.g. = own goal

European competitions
RSC Anderlechtois qualified for the first round of the 1962–63 European Champion Clubs' Cup by defeating 5 times winner Real Madrid of Spain in the preliminary round (drew 3-3 away, won 1-0 at home). In the first round proper, Anderlecht eliminated CSKA Red Star of Bulgaria (drew 2-2 away, won 2-0 at home) but lost in the quarter finals to the Scottish team of Dundee FC (lost 1-4 at home, 1-2 away).

RU Saint-Gilloise reached the second round of the 1962–63 Inter-Cities Fairs Cup by eliminating Olympique de Marseille of France (lost 0-1 away, won 4-2 at home). They then could not eliminate NK Dinamo (lost 1-2 away, won 1-0 at home and then lost 2-3 in a play-off match).

Honours

Final league tables

Premier Division

 1962-63 Top scorer: Victor Wégria (RFC Liégeois) with 24 goals.
 1962 Golden Shoe: Armand Jurion (RSC Anderlechtois)

References